"Live Twice" is the title track and the second single from Scottish singer Darius's second album, Live Twice (2004). The song was released on 10 January 2005 as his sixth and final single. It peaked at number seven on the UK Singles Chart and number 24 in Ireland. This was the final single to be released during Darius's lifetime.

Song history
The song was written about Darius's father, who was diagnosed with terminal cancer.

The song has some notable similarities in musical phrasing to Daniel Bedingfield's 2003 single "Never Gonna Leave Your Side", and both videos were shot in Spain with horses featuring prominently.

Music video
The video for "Live Twice" was filmed in Málaga, Spain in black and white. The church bell tolls and Darius is holding a rosary. He removes his tie and watch, symbolic of letting go of the material World. Groups of photographers and fans try to catch his attention but Darius walks through them like a spirit. He is shown chasing after a white horse but when it eventually stops it dies peacefully whilst a girl releases a dove as a symbol of hope. The white stallion used in filming the video also made an appearance as Brad Pitt's horse in the movie Troy.

Track listings
UK CD1
 "Live Twice"
 "Mystery of You"

UK CD2
 "Live Twice"
 "Big Feather Bed"
 "I Would Die for You"
 Enhanced section

UK DVD single
 "Live Twice" (video)
 "Live Twice" (behind the scenes footage)
 "Now or Never" (audio)

Charts

References

2004 songs
2005 singles
Darius Campbell songs
Mercury Records singles
Song recordings produced by Graham Stack (record producer)
Songs written by Darius Campbell
Songs written by Graham Stack (record producer)
Songs written by Tim Woodcock